Delphine Zanga Tsogo (December 21, 1935 – July 16, 2020) was a Cameroonian writer, feminist and politician. She served in the country's National Assembly from 1965 to 1972. Her married surname was Tsanga.

Biography
She was born in Lomié and was educated at Douala, going on to study nursing in Toulouse, France. She returned to Cameroon in 1960, working as a nurse in various hospitals. In 1964, she was elected national president of the Council of Cameroonian Women. From 1970 to 1975, she served as Vice Minister for Health and Public Welfare. From 1975 to 1984, she was Minister for Social Affairs for Cameroon.

She served as president of the administrative council for the United Nations International Research and Training Institute for the Advancement of Women, as well as president of the Comité Régional Africain de Coordination pour l’Intégration des Femmes au Développement. and vice-president of the International Council of Women. She was named to the French National Order of Merit.

In 1983, she wrote her first novel Vies de Femmes (Women's Lives). This was followed by L'Oiseau en cage (The Caged Bird) the following year.

References 

1935 births
2020 deaths
Members of the National Assembly (Cameroon)
Knights of the Ordre national du Mérite
Government ministers of Cameroon
People from East Region (Cameroon)
Cameroonian novelists
Cameroonian women novelists
20th-century novelists
20th-century women writers
Cameroonian feminists
Women government ministers of Cameroon
20th-century Cameroonian women politicians
20th-century Cameroonian politicians
20th-century Cameroonian writers
20th-century Cameroonian women writers
21st-century Cameroonian writers
21st-century Cameroonian women writers